Morpho amphitryon is a Neotropical butterfly.

Description
Morpho amphitryon is a very large butterfly with a wingspan of 150–160 mm. The top of the wings is a blue grey metallic colour with a wide grey border embellished by a submarginal row of white spots. The outer edge of the forewing is concave and the hindwings have a scalloped edge. "amphitrion Stgr. [as race of Morpho theseus], from Chanchamayo, South Peru, has the forewing much elongated, with the cell blue-grey. Males also occur with the upper surface suffused with blue-white throughout."

Habitat
Morpho amphitryon lives in Andean montane forests at altitudes from 700 to 2000 metres above sea level.

Status
Morpho amphitryon is a "scarce" or rare species.

Subspecies
M. a. amphitryon (Peru)
M. a. azurita Duchêne et Blandin, 2009
M. a. susarion Fruhstorfer, 1913 (Bolivia)
M. a. cinereus Duchêne, 1985 (Peru)

Distribution
This species is present in Bolivia and Peru. The northernmost population is in the mountain chain which forms the border between the Amazonas and San Martín departments. It is a Tropical Andes species.

References

Le Moult (E.) & Réal (P.), 1962-1963. Les Morpho d'Amérique du Sud et Centrale, Editions du cabinet entomologique E. Le Moult, Paris.
Duchêne, G. & Blandin, P., 2009. Les sous-espèces de Morpho (Iphimedeia) amphitryon Staudinger, 1887 en Bolivie et dans le sud du Pérou, et leurs rapports avec les sous-espèces de Morpho (Iphimedia) telemachus (Linnaeus, 1758) (Lepidoptera : Nymphalidae, Morphinae). Bulletin de la Société entomologique de France. 114(3) : 373-382.
Paul Smart, 1976 The Illustrated Encyclopedia of the Butterfly World in Color. London, Salamander: Encyclopedie des papillons. Lausanne, Elsevier Sequoia (French language edition)   page 231 fig.4 (Peru)

External links
Butterflies of America Images of type and other specimens.
"Morpho Fabricius, 1807" at Markku Savela's Lepidoptera and Some Other Life Forms
Butterfly Corner Images from Naturhistorisches Museum Wien

Morpho
Nymphalidae of South America
Butterflies described in 1887
Taxa named by Otto Staudinger